Eva is a 2018 romantic drama film written and directed by Benoît Jacquot, based on the 1945 novel Eve by James Hadley Chase. Starring Isabelle Huppert and Gaspard Ulliel, the film tells the story of a young fraudster who causes the death of a girl who loves him because of his obsession for an older high-class prostitute. It was selected to compete for the Golden Bear in the main competition section at the 68th Berlin International Film Festival.

Plot
Bertrand, a handsome young man who works as a male prostitute in Paris, leaves an elderly writer dead in his bath and steals the typescript of his just-finished play. Selling it to a publisher as his own work, it proves a success. Both the work and the apparent author greatly impress the publisher's assistant Caroline, who soon has Bertrand sleeping in her flat.

The pressure is now on Bertrand to write a follow-up, and he retreats to a mountain chalet to work. There he meets an older woman who completely fascinates him. This is Eva, who lives in her husband's elegant house and works as an expensive prostitute. She says her husband is on a prolonged business trip, but it is revealed to viewers that he is in jail. Obsessed by the enigmatic character of Eva and the things she tells him, Bertrand tells his publisher that she will be the subject of his next work. The publisher secretly books a session with Eva to see if she is real.

Caroline, sensing that Bertrand is avoiding her, turns up secretly at the chalet and finds Eva in the bath. Rushing away in despair, she crashes her car and is killed. Bertrand goes secretly to Eva's house, where a stranger beats him up so thoroughly that he is hospitalised. When released, he sees Eva in the street with a man viewers know is her just-released husband. She signals wordlessly to Bertrand to keep away.

Cast
 Isabelle Huppert as Eva
 Gaspard Ulliel as Bertrand
 Julia Roy as Caroline
 Marc Barbé as Georges Martin
 Richard Berry as Régis, the publisher

Release
The film had its world premiere in the Competition section at the 68th Berlin International Film Festival on 17 February 2018. It was released in France on 7 March 2018.

Reception
On Metacritic, which assigns a normalized rating to reviews, the film has a weighted average score of 38 out of 100, based on 5 critics, indicating "generally unfavorable reviews".

David Ehrlich of IndieWire gave the film a grade of C−, writing: "Stuck between a high-class thriller and a trashy Cinemax wank, Benoît Jacquot's latest feature ultimately offers the pleasures of neither." Jordan Mintzer of The Hollywood Reporter wrote, "Eva slides off the rails during a denouement that goes full on B-movie without much credibility."

See also
 Eva (1962 film), an earlier adaptation of the same novel

References

External links
 
 

2018 films
2018 romantic drama films
2010s French-language films
Arte France Cinéma films
BDSM in films
Belgian romantic drama films
Films about male prostitution in France
Films about prostitution in Paris
Films based on British novels
Films based on thriller novels
Films based on works by James Hadley Chase
Films directed by Benoît Jacquot
Films shot in Lyon
Films shot in Paris
French romantic drama films
2010s French films